Gnathodolus bidens is a species of headstander endemic to the Orinoco and Casiquiare rivers in Venezuela.  It is the only member of its genus.

Environment
Gnathodolus bidens is known to be found in a freshwater environment within a benthopelagic depth range. This species is native to a tropical climate.

Distribution
Gnathodolus bidens can be found in South America, Orinoco, Casiquiare rivers, and Venezuela.

Biology
Gnathodolus bidens has the ability to breed once the pair is in a heavily dense and weeded area. This species serves as no threat to humans and they are considered to be harmless.

Classification
The taxonomic classification of Gnathodolus bidens is as follows:
Kingdom : Animalia  	
Phylum : Chordata  
Subphylum : Vertebrata  	 
Superclass : Osteichthyes  	 
Class : Actinopterygii  	 
Subclass : Neopterygii 	 
Infraclass : Teleostei 	 
Superorder : Ostariophysi 	 
Order : Characiformes  	 
Family : Anostomidae   
Subfamily : Anostominae 	 
Genus : Gnathodolus 
Species : Gnathodolus bidens

References

Notes
 

Anostomidae
Monotypic fish genera
Fish of Venezuela
Endemic fauna of Venezuela
Fish described in 1927